The Azerbaijani football league system is a series of generally unconnected leagues for Azerbaijani football clubs. The Azerbaijani system is more complicated than many other national league systems, consisting of two completely separate systems of leagues and clubs, senior football and junior football. The two systems have nothing to do with the ages of the players involved.

In senior football in Azerbaijan there are two men's national leagues, the Azerbaijan Premier League and the Azerbaijan First Division, and one women's national league, the Azerbaijani Women's Football Championship which is run less regularly. There are also several leagues (most notably the Azerbaijani Regional League), but there is no regular promotion or relegation between the regional leagues and the national league.

PFC Neftchi Baku are the current record holders with 5 titles.

Rejection of a pyramid system 
Overall, the structure of football in Azerbaijan is amongst the most fractured and multi-faceted in Europe, being unique in having a plurality of adult male governing bodies (with Seniors, Juniors and Amateurs - see below). It is also unusual in the modern era in having declined to create a structured pyramid system, and as a result it is practically impossible for clubs at the bottom of the system to progress to the top, or for weak clubs to be relegated down the leagues.

Current system

Senior football 

The current system has been in place since the creation of the Azerbaijan Premier League at the start of the 2001-2002 season. For each division, its official name, sponsored name and number of clubs is given:

Below this national structure, but entirely separate of it and of each other, are 9 regional leagues, which include the North, West, Nakhchivan, Central, Karabakh, Baku, South and North-West Regional Football Leagues. They are all overseen by the Azerbaijan Football Association but they do not participate in the Azerbaijan Cup, with most clubs ineligible due to having inadequate stadiums.

The women's league was first formed in 2003, though it was not then held between 2008-23 except for 2 and a half seasons. Only a top division has been run and the number of teams has varied considerably before.

Amateur football 
Azerbaijan's Amateur League is divided into four regions, which includes Baku, North, West and Central Region.

Cup eligibility

Domestic cups 
All Azerbaijan Premier League and Azerbaijan First Division clubs directly enter the Azerbaijan Cup.

European cups
From season 2008-09, the top side in the Azerbaijan Premier League qualify for the second qualifying stage of Champions League, while the second and third placed teams qualifying for the first qualifying stage of UEFA Europa League. The winners of the Azerbaijan Cup also qualify for the Europa League's second qualifying stage.

While Azeri clubs initially entered the UEFA Women's Champions League from 2003, the removal of the senior league has meant that no Azeri team has competed since 2007.

See also 
 League system
 List of football clubs in Azerbaijan

References

External links 
 Azerbaijan Football Association
 Professional Football League of Azerbaijan

     
Azerbaijan